In computational complexity theory, a sparse language is a formal language (a set of strings) such that the complexity function, counting the number of strings of length n in the language, is bounded by a polynomial function of n. They are used primarily in the study of the relationship of the complexity class NP with other classes. The complexity class of all sparse languages is called SPARSE.

Sparse languages are called sparse because there are a total of 2n strings of length n, and if a language only contains polynomially many of these, then the proportion of strings of length n that it contains rapidly goes to zero as n grows. All unary languages are sparse. An example of a nontrivial sparse language is the set of binary strings containing exactly k 1 bits for some fixed k; for each n, there are only  strings in the language, which is bounded by nk.

Relationships to other complexity classes 

SPARSE contains TALLY, the class of unary languages, since these have at most one string of any one length. Although not all languages in P/poly are sparse, there is a polynomial-time Turing reduction from any language in P/poly to a sparse language.
Fortune showed in 1979 that if any sparse language is co-NP-complete, then P = NP;
Mahaney used this to show in 1982 that if any sparse language is NP-complete, then P = NP (this is Mahaney's theorem).
A simpler proof of this based on left-sets was given by Ogihara and Watanabe in 1991.
Mahaney's argument does not actually require the sparse language to be in NP (because the existence of an NP-hard sparse set implies the existence of an NP-complete sparse set), so there is a sparse NP-hard set if and only if P = NP.
Further, E ≠ NE if and only if there exist sparse languages in NP that are not in P.
There is a Turing reduction (as opposed to the Karp reduction from Mahaney's theorem) from an NP-complete language to a sparse language if and only if .
In 1999, Jin-Yi Cai and D. Sivakumar, building on work by Ogihara, showed that if there exists a sparse P-complete problem, then L = P.

References

External links
 Lance Fortnow. Favorite Theorems: Small Sets. April 18, 2006.
 William Gasarch. Sparse Sets (Tribute to Mahaney). June 29, 2007.
 

Formal languages
Computational complexity theory